Schamroth is a surname. Notable people with this surname include:

 Helen Schamroth (born 1940s), Polish-New Zealand craft artist and author
 Leo Schamroth (1924–1988), South African cardiologist